69 songs written by 139 songwriters have won the Eurovision Song Contest, an annual competition organised by member countries of the European Broadcasting Union. The contest, which has been broadcast every year since its debut in 1956 (with the exception of 2020), is one of the longest-running television programmes in the world. The contest's winner has been determined using numerous voting techniques throughout its history; centre to these have been the awarding of points to countries by juries or televoters. The country awarded the most points is declared the winner. The first Eurovision Song Contest was not won on points, but by votes (two per country), and only the winner was announced.

There have been 66 contests, with one winner each year except the tied 1969 contest, which had four. Twenty-seven countries have won the contest. Switzerland won the first contest in 1956. The country with the highest number of wins is Ireland, with seven. The only person to have won more than once as performer is Ireland's Johnny Logan, who performed "What's Another Year" in 1980 and "Hold Me Now" in 1987. Logan is also one of only five songwriters to have written more than one winning entry ("Hold Me Now" in 1987 and "Why Me?" in 1992, performed by Linda Martin). This makes Logan the only person to have three Eurovision victories to their credit, as either singer, songwriter or both. The other four songwriters with more than one winning entry to their credit are Willy van Hemert (Netherlands, 1957 and 1959), Yves Dessca (Monaco, 1971 and Luxembourg, 1972), Rolf Løvland (Norway, 1985 and 1995) and Brendan Graham (Ireland, 1994 and 1996).

Relatively few winners of the Eurovision Song Contest have gone on to achieve major success in the music industry. The most notable winners who have gone on to become international stars are ABBA, who won the 1974 contest for Sweden with their song "Waterloo", and Céline Dion, who won the 1988 contest for Switzerland with the song "".

Since 2008, the winner has been awarded an official winner's trophy of the Eurovision Song Contest. The trophy is a handmade piece of sandblasted glass in the shape of a 1950s microphone. The songwriters and composers of the winning entry receive smaller versions of the trophy. The original design was created by Kjell Engman of Kosta Boda, who specialises in glass art.

Winners by year

Performers and songwriters with multiple wins 
The following individuals have won the Eurovision Song Contest as a performer or songwriter more than once.

Observations 

Eleven Eurovision winners (alongside three non-winners) were featured at the special concert Congratulations: 50 Years of the Eurovision Song Contest in 2005, in which ABBA's "Waterloo" was voted the most popular song of the contest's first fifty years.

 has finished first seven times, more than any other country. Ireland also won the contest for three consecutive years (1992, 1993, 1994), the only country to ever do so. By contrast, Portugal holds the record for waiting the longest to achieve their first win, doing so in 2017; 53 years after their first appearance in the contest. Austria holds the record for longest wait in between wins, having won for the first time in 1966 and a second time in 2014. Under the voting system used between 1975 and 2015, the winner of the contest was decided by the final voting nation on eleven occasions.

Changes to the voting system, including a steady growth in the number of countries participating and voting, means that the points earned are not comparable across the decades. Portugal's Salvador Sobral holds the record of the highest number of points in the contest's history, earning 758 with the song "Amar pelos dois". Norway's Alexander Rybak holds the largest margin of victory in absolute points, a 169-point cushion over second place in 2009. Italy's Gigliola Cinquetti holds the record for largest victory by percentage, scoring almost three times as many as second place (49 points compared with 17 by the runner-up) in the 1964 contest.

Under the voting system used from 1975 until 2015, in which each country gives maximum points to its first place choice, Sweden's Loreen won the 2012 contest with the most ever first place votes earned, receiving first place votes from 18 of 41 countries (excluding themselves).  The 1976 winner for the United Kingdom, Brotherhood of Man, holds the record of the highest average score per participating country, with an average of 9.65 points received per country.  Azerbaijani winners Ell and Nikki hold the lowest average score for a winning song under that system, receiving 5.14 points per country.

In 2016, Jamala's "1944", representing Ukraine, became the first winning entry since the jury vote was re-introduced alongside the televote in 2009 to place first in neither area, coming second in the jury vote behind Australia and second in the televote behind Russia. Duncan Laurence's "Arcade", representing the Netherlands, became the second such winner in the 2019 contest, having placed third behind North Macedonia and Sweden in the jury vote, and second behind Norway in the televote.

Around two-thirds of the winning songs were performed in the second half of the final. According to the official statistics, until 2019, only 34.3% of the winning songs were performed in the first half, including 3 of the 4 winners in 1969. The only song to win without being clearly in one half or the other was the Israeli entry "Hallelujah" in 1979, which was drawn 10th out of 19 songs. Between 2005 and 2013, all the winning songs were performed in the second half of the final's running order.

The  has finished second sixteen times at Eurovision (most recently in 2022), more than any other country.  has finished third and fourth seven times at Eurovision (most recently respectively in 1981 and in 2001), and  has finished fifth nine times at Eurovision (most recently in 2019). The country with the most top three places that has never won the contest is Malta, having finished second in 2002 and 2005 and third in 1992 and 1998. Another island nation, Iceland, has also finished second twice, in 1999 and 2009. With Portugal achieving its first win in 2017, Malta now also holds the record for longest wait for a first win, having first shown up in the contest in 1971 (although Cyprus has more winless appearances, with 36 since debuting in 1981, due to Malta taking a break from 1976 through 1990). Spain holds the current record for longest drought by a winning country, having last won in 1969. They are followed by France (1977) and Belgium (1986).

There is no official runner-up for two of the contests – 1956 and 1969. In 1956 only the winner, Switzerland, was announced, whilst there were speculative reports that Germany ended up in second place with "Im Wartesaal zum großen Glück" by Walter Andreas Schwarz, given that Germany was chosen to host the 1957 contest. In 1969, four songs shared first place by achieving the same number of points; fifth place was achieved by Switzerland, which is not considered an official runner-up, because of the draw for first place.

Winners by country 

France was the first country to win three times (completed in ), four times (completed in ), and five times (completed in ). Ireland was the first country to win six times (completed in ) and seven times (completed in ).

The year 1969 is in italics to indicate the joint (four-way) win.

Gallery

Performers

Songwriters

See also 
 Eurovision Song Contest winners discography
 List of Junior Eurovision Song Contest winners

Notes and references

Notes

References

Bibliography 

 Eurovision Song Contest: History by events
 

Winners
Eurovision Song Contest winners